Halocyntia papillosa, also known as the red sea squirt is a sea peach or sea squirt, a species of tunicate.

Distribution
This species occurs at depths of 2 to 100 metres It attaches itself to rocks and  overhangs, or among Posidonia. It can be found in the Northeast Atlantic, Western Pacific, along the Portuguese coast, and the Mediterranean.

Description
Halocynthia papillosa is usually about 10 cm high but can reach 20 cm. It can contract when disturbed.

References

External resources
 

Stolidobranchia
Animals described in 1765
Taxa named by Johan Ernst Gunnerus